= State Labour Inspectorate (Albania) =

Albanian government agency

- Inspektoriati Shtetëror i Punës
- Official logo

Labour agency overview
- Formed: 1992
- Jurisdiction: Albania
- Headquarters: Tirana
- Labour agency executive: Dritan Ylli, Director General
- Website: inspektoriatipunes.gov.al

The State Labour and Social Services Inspectorate (ISHPSHS) (Albanian: Inspektoriati Shtetëror i Punës dhe Shërbimeve Sociale) is a government agency in Albania tasked to ensure the implementation of legal provisions on working conditions of employees, in the exercise of their profession, duration of work, salaries, insurance, hygiene, welfare, employment of minors, juveniles, women and other labour related issues.
